Charles Webster "Charlie" Doe Jr. (September 4, 1898 – November 19, 1995) was an American rugby union player who competed in the 1920 Summer Olympics and 1924 Summer Olympics as a member of the United States national rugby union team.  Doe was born in San Francisco, California and died in Contra Costa County, California. He made four total appearances for the United States national rugby union team, winning gold medals at each of the 1920 and 1924 Olympics.

References

External links
 
 
 
 Charlie Doe at USA Rugby

1898 births
1995 deaths
American rugby union players
Rugby union players at the 1920 Summer Olympics
Rugby union players at the 1924 Summer Olympics
Olympic gold medalists for the United States in rugby
United States international rugby union players
Medalists at the 1924 Summer Olympics
Medalists at the 1920 Summer Olympics
19th-century American people
20th-century American people